Badminton tournaments were held for the third time at the 6th Asian Games in 1970 in Bangkok, Thailand from 9 to 20 December 1970.

Singles, doubles, and team events were contested for both men and women. Mixed Doubles were also contested.

Medalists

Medal table

Semifinal results

Final results

References

Results

External links
Badminton Asia

 
Badminton
Asian Games
Multi-sport events, Asian Games
Multi-sport events, Asian Games
1970